Shijie is a town in Guangde County, Anhui, China.

Towns in Anhui